Sushar Manaying (born January 9, 1988) is a Thai actress and singer.

Sushar achieved widespread fame in Asia, especially China, for her leading role in the 2010 movie Yes or No.

Names
She was born as Sucha. She later changed the name to Sucharat and to the present one, Sushar, respectively.

Her Thai nickname is Aom.

She is of Thai Chinese descent. Her Chinese name is Li Haina.

Education
Sushar completed high school at Suranaree School in her hometown, Nakhon Ratchasima. She then studied performing arts at Srinakharinwirot University in Bangkok, from which she graduated with a second-class honours degree.

Career
In 2010 and 2012, Sushar played as the leading character, Pie, in the Thai lesbian film, Yes or No and Yes or No 2, with Suppanad Jittaleela.

In 2013, she was given the role of Yoon or Choi Eun-suh (originally played by Song Hye-kyo) in the Thai remake of the Korean drama Autumn in My Heart, in which the male leading role was assumed by Jesdaporn Pholdee.

In 2014, she took the role of Han Ji-eun (originally played by Song Hye-kyo) in the Thai remake of the Korean drama Full House, in which she paired up with actor Pirat Nitipaisalkul.

In 2015, she and her Full House co-star Pirat reunited in the Thai drama, Kiss Me, an adaptation of the Japanese manga Itazura na Kiss.

In 2017, she was given the role of Bai Ling in Chinese horror movie Haunted Road 2, in which she paired up with Chinese actor Leon Li Chuan. The movie is about the lovers from China went to Malaysia from assignment work of company but later find herself trapped in Time perception.

Filmography

Film

Television series

Discography

Single

Original soundtracks

Awards and nominations

References

External links
 
 
 Sushar Manaying on YouTube

1993 births
Living people
Sushar Manaying
Sushar Manaying
Sushar Manaying
Sushar Manaying
Sushar Manaying